Jiang Chunfang (–) was a Chinese translator, educationist, and one of the founders of the Encyclopedia of China.  He was born in Changzhou, Jiangsu.  He had a number of aliases, including Lin Ling, Shi Yun, and Cai Yun.

Biography
Jiang joined the Communist Youth League of China in 1931, and became a member of the Communist Party the next year.  He was the heads of the Propaganda Departments of the Youth League's Committees in Harbin and Manchuria.  He also worked as a Russian translator at the England–Asia Telegraphic Agency under the appointment of Luo Dengxian.

In 1936, Jiang began working as a translator for the Asian Motion Pictures Company in Shanghai, which specialized in Russian films.  In 1938, he became the Secretary-General of the Culture Subcommittee of the Communist Party's Shanghai Bureau.  In 1941, after consultations with ITAR-TASS, he started the Times Weekly on behalf of the Soviet side, and acted as the editor-in-chief.  Later in 1945 he would become the editor-in-chief of his newly founded Times Daily and the president of Times Press.

After the establishment of the People's Republic of China, Jiang acted as the first president of the Shanghai Russian Language School, which later became Shanghai International Studies University.  His job career also included Director of Liaisons at the Shanghai Cultural Bureau, and Deputy Director and Consultant at the Communist Party Central Committee's Compilation and Translation Bureau of the Works of Marx, Engels, Lenin, and Stalin.

During the Cultural Revolution, Jiang was imprisoned at the Qincheng Prison for 7 years.  He was released in 1975.

After 1978, Jiang served as vice chair of General Editorial Board of the Encyclopedia of China and the editor-in-chief of the Encyclopedia of China Press.

Jiang was the founder and president of the Chinese Translation Workers Association, which is now the Translators Association of China.  He was also members of the Fifth and Sixth CPPCC Standing Committees.

References 
 
 

Educators from Changzhou
1912 births
1987 deaths
Chinese encyclopedists
Writers from Changzhou
Republic of China translators
People's Republic of China translators
Republic of China journalists
People's Republic of China journalists
Academic staff of Shanghai International Studies University
Presidents of Shanghai International Studies University
Victims of the Cultural Revolution
Chinese Communist Party politicians from Jiangsu
Members of the Standing Committee of the 5th Chinese People's Political Consultative Conference
Members of the Standing Committee of the 6th Chinese People's Political Consultative Conference
People's Republic of China politicians from Jiangsu
Politicians from Changzhou
20th-century Chinese translators